Taje is a village and gram panchayat in Mawal taluka of Pune district in the state of Maharashtra, India.

Administration
The village is administrated by a sarpanch, an elected representative who leads a gram panchayat. At the time of the 2011 Census of India, the village was the headquarters for the eponymous gram panchayat, which also governed the villages of Pimpaloli and Pathargaon.

Demographics
At the 2011 census, the village comprised 167 households. The population of 986 was split between 516 males and 470 females.

See also
List of villages in Mawal taluka

References

Villages in Mawal taluka
Gram Panchayats in Pune district